Masal County is in Gilan province, Iran. The capital of the county is the city of Masal. At the 2006 census, the county's population was 47,648 in 12,328 households. The following census in 2011 counted 52,496 people in 14,984 households. At the 2016 census, the county's population was 52,649 in 16,901 households.

Administrative divisions

The population history of Masal County's administrative divisions over three consecutive censuses is shown in the following table. The latest census shows two districts, four rural districts, and two cities.

References

 

Counties of Gilan Province